Abdullah "Babajani" Khan Durrani is an Indian politician from Pathri town of Maharashtra who belongs to the Nationalist Congress Party. Currently he is member of Maharashtra Legislative Council and Parbhani district president Nationalist Congress Party, he also served as a Member of Maharashtra Legislative Assembly from Pathri from 2004 to 2009. He previously represented the Parbhani-Hingoli Local Authorities constituency in the Maharashtra Legislative Council.

Political profile
He is known for his strong hold in Pathri town and as a Sharad Pawar confidant in the political spectrum. He started his political career as a member of Pathri municipal council and later became President of Pathri municipal council and Wakf Board member.
He defeated 3 time MLA, Haribhau Lahane of Shivsena in 2004 Maharashtra assembly elections as a Nationalist Congress Party candidate from Pathri (Vidhan Sabha constituency). 
He got elected as Member of Maharashtra 
Legislative Council in 2012 from Parbhani-Hingoli local authorities constituency. On 10 July 2018 he got re-elected unopposed as Member of Maharashtra 
Legislative Council.

Positions held
 Member, Pathri Municipal Council
 President, Pathri Municipal Council 
 Member, Maharashtra State Board of Waqf 
 Member, Maharashtra Legislative Assembly (MLA) 
 Member, Maharashtra Legislative Council (MLC) 
 District President, Nationalist Congress Party

References

Living people
Members of the Maharashtra Legislative Council
Nationalist Congress Party politicians from Maharashtra
People from Parbhani district
People from Marathwada
Year of birth missing (living people)
Muslim politics in India
21st-century Indian Muslims
People from Maharashtra